Cold Blue Rebels is a four piece Psychobilly band from Los Angeles, California formed in 2009 by members of Jetboy, The Zeros and Glamour Punks. To date, the band has released two albums and one digital EP.

History 
Cold Blue Rebels was formed in 2009 by bassist Danny Dangerous, vocalist Mickey Finn, guitarist Joe Normal and drummer vocalist Spazz Draztik. The band played their debut show on November 28, 2009, in Downtown Los Angeles 

In October 2011, it was announced that the band had completed work on their debut album, “Blood, Guts, n’ Rock & Roll”, for a January 2011 release. The band promoted its release by releasing the video "Hell Block 13".

Cold Blue Rebels performed at a special 40th-anniversary party for Rainbow Bar and Grill on Sunday, April 15, 2012.
 They performed at the Whisky a Go Go as part of Sunset Strip Music Festival on August 18, 2012.

Cold Blue Rebels released their second album “Love Of The Undead” in 2012, and were added as special guests to two separate legs of Wednesday 13’s “Curse The Living” tour.

In 2015, drummer Al Diablo joined Micky Finn a member of Jetboy.

On October 18, 2019, Cold Blue Rebels announced the release of their EP “The House That Frank Built” to commemorate the band's 10 year anniversary. This also marked the return of original drummer Spazz Draztik.

Band members
Mickey Finn - lead vocals
Danny Dangerous - bass, vocals
Joe Normal - guitar
Spazz Draztik - drums

Former members
 Al Diablo - drums (2012–2018)
 Thunders Inazuma - guitar (2013)

Discography 
Blood, Guts N' Rock & Roll (2012)
Love Of The Undead (2014)
The House That Frank Built (2019)

Notes and references

External links
 
 
 Cold Blue Rebels at Allmusic

American psychobilly musical groups
Horror punk groups
Musical groups from Los Angeles
Country musicians from California